Naugaon railway station is a railway station on Indore–Gwalior line under the Bhopal railway division of West Central Railway zone. This is situated beside Shitla Mata Mandir Road at Naugaon in Gwalior district of the Indian state of Madhya Pradesh.

References

Railway stations in Gwalior district
Bhopal railway division